Rosny is the name of several places:
Rosny, Tasmania in Australia
Rosny-sous-Bois commune in the Seine-Saint-Denis département in France
Rosny-sur-Seine commune in the Yvelines département in France
Rosny, Nevada in Lander County, Nevada in the United States of America

See also
J.-H. Rosny